is a district located in Kōchi Prefecture, Japan.

As of December 2014, the district has an estimated population of 17,538 and a density of 31.1 persons per km2. The total area is 563.33 km2.

Aki is known as the birthplace of Iwasaki Yatarō, the founder of the modern day Mitsubishi conglomerate.

Towns and villages 
Nahari
Tano
Tōyō
Yasuda
Geisei
Kitagawa
Umaji

Districts in Kōchi Prefecture